William Hirstein is an American philosopher primarily interested in philosophy of mind, philosophy of language, metaphysics, cognitive science, and analytic philosophy. He is a professor of philosophy at Elmhurst University.

Training
William Hirstein received his Ph.D. in philosophy at the University of California, Davis under the direction of Richard Wollheim. He then did post-doctoral work under the supervision of Patricia Churchland and Vilayanur S. Ramachandran at the University of California, San Diego, exploring neurological syndromes that lead to confabulation, such as in split-brain patients, and patients with anosognosia or Capgras delusion.

Theory of confabulation
Hirstein draws heavily on the interaction between his philosophical training and his clinical experience in his 2005 book Brain Fiction to develop a comprehensive epistemic theory of the neural basis of confabulation, and argues that prefrontal executive processes fail to correct false memories or perceptions, resulting in a confabulation. Thus confabulation is a result of two errors, which may be caused by two separate brain lesions. First there is an error in memory or perception, and second, prefrontal executive processes fail to correct the error.

Mindmelding hypothesis

In his 2012 book, Mindmelding: Consciousness, Neuroscience, and the Mind's Privacy, Hirstein argues that a significant block to solving the mind–body problem can be removed if we allow that it is possible for one person to directly experience the conscious mind of another. The vast majority of philosophers and scientists writing about consciousness believe that this is impossible, but this would mean that conscious brain states are different from all other physical states, which can be known about by multiple persons. This creates a block to understanding our minds as physical systems. Hirstein describes how "mindmelding" could be achieved by connecting person A's prefrontal lobes to person B's posterior cortex, which would in effect connect person A's sense of self to person B's conscious thoughts and sensations.

Books

See also
 American philosophy
 List of American philosophers

References

External links
Philpapers Page
Psychology Today Blog
Researchgate Page
American Scientist Interview
American Scientist Review of Brain Fiction: Self-Deception and the Riddle of Confabulation
Ramachandran, V. S. & W. Hirstein (1998), "The perception of phantom limbs: The D.O. Hebb lecture.", Brain 9 (121):1603-1630
V.S. Ramachandran and W. Hirstein, Three Laws of Qualia: What Neurology Tells Us about the Biological Functions of Consciousness, Qualia and the Self
W. Hirstein, V. S. Ramachandran, Proceedings of the Royal Society B: Biological Sciences Capgras syndrome: a novel probe for understanding the neural representation of the identity and familiarity of persons
 V.S. Ramachandran and W. Hirstein, The Science of Art: A Neurological Theory of Aesthetic Experience. Journal of Consciousness Studies, Volume 6, No.6/7, (June/July 1999)
Mindmelding: Connected Brains and the Problem of Consciousness, W. Hirstein, Mens Sana Research Foundation Monograph Series, Vol. 6, Issue 1, 2008

Philosophers of language
Philosophers of mind
American cognitive scientists
20th-century American philosophers
21st-century American philosophers
Living people
University of California, Davis alumni
Year of birth missing (living people)